George Watts may refer to:

 George Watts (American football) (1918–1990), American football offensive tackle
 George Frederic Watts (1817–1904), English Victorian painter and sculptor
 George Washington Watts (1851–1921), American manufacturer, financier and philanthropist
 George Watts (cricketer) (1867–1949), English cricketer
 George Albert Watts (died 1957), mayor of St Pancras, London
 George Edward Watts (1786–1860), Royal Navy officer
 George Watts (actor) (1879–1942), American actor

See also
 George Watt (disambiguation)